Kalarrytes is a village and a former community in the Ioannina regional unit, Epirus, Greece. It is populated mostly by Aromanians (Vlachs). Since the 2011 local government reform it is part of the municipality North Tzoumerka, of which it is a municipal unit. The municipal unit has an area of 39.959 km2. The population in 2011 was 192.

Climate
Kalarrytes has a temperate oceanic climate (Köppen climate classification: Cfb), bordering on a warm-summer mediterranean climate (Köppen climate classification: Csb). Kalarites experiences cool, rainy winters and warm, drier summers.

Notable inhabitants
Sotirios Voulgaris, who founded the jewelry and luxury goods company Bulgari was born in Kalarites.

References

Aromanian settlements in Greece
Populated places in Ioannina (regional unit)